Andrés Martín may refer to:

Andrés Martín (boxer) (born 1949), Spanish boxer
Andrés Martín (footballer) (born 1999), Spanish footballer
Andrés San Martín (born 1978), Argentine footballer
Andres Martin (tennis) (born 2001), American tennis player